The Martinovitch-Orlovitch is the name of a noble family originating in the medieval Serbia.

History 
They are descendants of the ancient Orlovitch family and one of Serbia's great heroes, Paul Orlovitch, the Serbian flag-bearer at the Battle of Kosovo in 1389. One of the most famous members of this family was Obren Martinovitch who led the Serbian uprising against the Ottoman Empire and started the Obrenovitch dynasty that would rule Serbia until their assassination by the Black Hand and replacement by the Karageorgevitch family. Through marriage of Anastasia Martinovitch-Orlovitch (1824-1895) into the Montenegrin royal family, Martinovitch-Orlovitch blood can be found in the royal families of Montenegro, Serbia, Russia, and Italy.

Though the use of titles of nobility (in the traditional sense) in the Balkans is somewhat disputed, the members of the family carry the title of voyévode (vojvoda, loosely translated as duke), though several members had carried the title of knez (loosely translated as prince) and others tied to their functions under the Ottoman regime. Just like the other descendants of the Orlovitch family, the Martinovitch have an eagle in their crest and Saint John the Baptist as their patron saint.

Family 

Due to a later stabilisation of family names in the Balkans compared to the rest of Europe, most of the members of the Martinovitch-Orlovitch family do not actually carry that last name. The family is composed of the following branches:

 Batrićević (Batritchevitch)
 Dolević (Dolevitch)
 Ivanović (Ivanowitsch)
 Ljuharović (Lyouharovitch)
 Marković (Markovitch)
 Milošević (Milochevitch)
 Muhović (Muhowicz)
 Obrenovitch
 Tomašević (Tomachevitch)
 Prenkić (Prenkitch)
 Raitchevitch

Through common Orlovitch ancestry, they are related to the Samardžić, Osmanagić or Čengić family, but also to Nikola Tesla (disputed).

References 

Serbian royal families